Colomychus is a genus of moths of the family Crambidae.

Species
Colomychus florepicta (Dyar, 1914)
Colomychus talis (Grote, 1878)

References

Spilomelinae
Crambidae genera
Taxa named by Eugene G. Munroe